Admiral Sir Hugo Lewis Pearson KCB (30 June 1843 – 12 June 1912) was a Royal Navy officer who served as both Commander-in-Chief, Australia Station and Commander-in-Chief, The Nore.

Naval career
Hugo Lewis Pearson joined the Royal Navy in 1855. In his early career, he was promoted to Lieutenant on 14 September 1863 and only 3 weeks later, On 20 October, Captain Henry Boys reported on Pearson's "active conduct in a fire breaking out out in the Pelorus." In February, 1865 Pearson destroyed piratical junks in Jungwa Bay.

Pearson was promoted to Commander with seniority of 6 February 1872, and was promoted to the rank of Captain with seniority of 9 December 1879.

He was Captain of the first-rate HMS St Vincent, the Royal yacht Osborne and the second-rate, HMS Colossus. He went on to command the shore establishment HMS Excellent and, later, the battleships HMS Collingwood and HMS Barfleur. Between 1892 and 1895 he was Aide-de-Camp to Queen Victoria, and was the Rear Admiral of the Reserve Fleet during the Jubilee Review in 1897.

In 1898 he became Commander in Chief, Australia Station and served as such for two years until late 1900, when he returned to the United Kingdom and bought Rocklands House in Goodrich, Herefordshire. On 19 March 1901, he was promoted to vice-admiral and in 1903 he became Commander-in-Chief, The Nore, a post he held until 1907. He retired on 30 June 1908.

Personal life
A member of a notable Staffordshire family with a long tradition of service in India and the British Armed Forces, Pearson was the grandson of John Pearson (1771-1841), who was a barrister and senior East India Company official who served as Advocate-General of Bengal from 1824 to 1840. His father General Thomas Hooke Pearson CB (1806-1892) served as an ADC to the Earl Amherst, then Governor-General of India.

In 1874 he married Emily Frances Mary Key (1848-1930) who was the second daughter of General George William Key. The couple had two sons and a daughter that survived into adulthood (two other children died in infancy). Their eldest son, Lieutenant Reginald William Pearson, was killed in 1900 in the Siege of Ladysmith during the Boer War and his parents erected a memorial window in Goodrich Church in his honour which can still be seen today. His younger son was Vice-Admiral John Lewis Pearson CMG (1879-1965).

Hugo Pearson died on 12 June 1912, aged 69. He left estate of the gross value of £51,971, with net personalty of £43,888. His surviving son John inherited Rocklands House.

Of note, Hugo Pearson's grandson (John Pearson's son) was General Sir Thomas Cecil Hook Pearson,  (1 July 1914 – 15 December 2019), a senior officer of the British Army who served as Commander-in-Chief of Allied Forces Northern Europe, thus making him the fourth generation of the Pearson family to achieve Flag or General rank.

Arms

References

|-

1843 births
1912 deaths
Royal Navy admirals
Knights Commander of the Order of the Bath
People from Barwell